Haplogroup E-P147 is a human Y-chromosome DNA haplogroup. Haplogroup E-P147, along with the less common haplogroup E-M75, is one of the two main branches of the older haplogroup E-M96. The E-P147 clade is commonly observed throughout Africa and is divided into two subclades: the less common, haplogroup E-M33, and the more common, haplogroup E-P177.

Distribution

E-P147 includes most of the subclades found in E-M96. The two branches of E-P147 have different distributions; while the less common branch, E-M33, has more of a distribution within West Africa, the more common branch, E-P177, can be found widely distributed with high frequency throughout Africa and to a lesser extent in the Middle East and Europe.

Subclades

E-P177

Haplogroup E-P177 is a subclade of haplogroup E-P147.

E-M132

Haplogroup E-M132 is a subclade of haplogroup E-P147.

Phylogenetics

Phylogenetic history

Prior to 2002, there were in academic literature at least seven naming systems for the Y-Chromosome Phylogenetic tree. This led to considerable confusion. In 2002, the major research groups came together and formed the Y-Chromosome Consortium (YCC). They published a joint paper that created a single new tree that all agreed to use. Later, a group of citizen scientists with an interest in population genetics and genetic genealogy formed a working group to create an amateur tree aiming at being above all timely. The table below brings together all of these works at the point of the landmark 2002 YCC Tree. This allows a researcher reviewing older published literature to quickly move between nomenclatures.

Research publications

The following research teams per their publications were represented in the creation of the YCC tree.

Phylogenetic trees

See also

Genetics

Y-DNA E subclades

Y-DNA backbone tree

References

Sources for conversion tables

External links

 Y-DNA Haplogroup E and Its Subclades from ISOGG 2008

E

ca:Haplogrup E del cromosoma Y humà
de:Haplogruppe E (Y-DNA)
es:Haplogrupo E ADN-Y
fr:Haplogroupe E (Y-ADN)